Uncharacterized LOC100272216 is a protein present in humans that is encoded by the LOC100272216 gene.

References

Further reading

Human proteins